Marginella lamarcki is a species of sea snail, a marine gastropod mollusk in the family Marginellidae, the margin snails.

Description
The length of the shell varies between 22 mm and 30 mm.

Distribution
This marine species occurs in the Atlantic Ocean off Senegal

References

External links
 

lamarcki
Gastropods described in 2004